The Russian National Badminton Championships is a tournament organized to crown the best badminton players in Russia. The tournament started in 1992.

Past winners

References
Badminton Europe – Details of affiliated national organisations

National badminton championships
Recurring sporting events established in 1992
National championships in Russia
Badminton tournaments in Russia